Giuseppe Bertolucci (27 February 1947 – 16 June 2012) was an Italian film director and screenwriter. He directed 26 films between 1972 and 2012. He was the younger brother of Bernardo Bertolucci.

Selected filmography
 Berlinguer, I Love You (Berlinguer ti voglio bene, 1977)
 An Italian Woman (Oggetti smarriti, 1980)
 Secrets Secrets (Segreti segreti, 1984)
 The Strangeness of Life (Strana la vita, 1987)
 The Camels (I cammelli, 1988)
 Especially on Sunday (La domenica specialmente, 1991)
 Troppo Sole (1994)
 The Sweet Sounds of Life (Il dolce rumore della vita, 1999)
 Probably Love (L'amore probabilmente, 2001)

References

External links

1947 births
2012 deaths
Italian film directors
Italian screenwriters
Film people from Parma
Italian male screenwriters